The Fraternity Award is an honor given annually by the Uruguayan branch of the Jewish organization B'nai B'rith.

History
The Uruguayan branch of B'nai B'rith created the Fraternity Award in 1982, to promote the arts and to support national artists in the areas of Literature, Plastic Arts, Visual Arts, Dance, Theater, and Music. The prize consists of granting a trip to Israel and a country in Europe, which allows the winner to get in touch with the development and cultural projection of other areas. The winner performs a concert, exhibition, play, or lecture.

In 2012 the award was declared to be of national interest by President José Mujica.

Winners

1982, Marosa di Giorgio (literature)
1983,  (plastic arts)
1984, Stella Santos (theater)
1985, Miguel Ángel Marozzi (music)
1986,  (literature)
1987,  (plastic arts) 
1988, Héctor Manuel Vidal (theater)
1989, Esteban Falconi (music)
1990, Tomás de Mattos (literature)
1991,  (plastic arts)
1992, Jorge Curi (theater) 
1993,  (music)
1994, Napoleón Baccino Ponce de León (literature) 
1995, Nelson Ramos (plastic arts)
1996, Roberto Suárez (theater)
1998,  (literature)
1999,  (plastic arts)
2000, Levón Burunsuzian (theater)
2001, Francisco Simaldoni (music)
2002, Leonardo Garet (literature)
2003,  (plastic arts)
2004, Margarita Musto (theater)
2005: Jorge Camiruaga (music)
2006:  (literature)
2007:  (plastic arts)
2008: Mario Ferreira (theater)
2010: Federico Veiroj (film)
2012: Federica Folco (dance)
2013:  (music)
2014, Fermín Hontou (plastic arts).
2015, Alicia Alfonso.
 2016, 
 2017, Federico Nathan (música).

References

1982 establishments in South America
Fraternity Award